Susan Crawford may refer to:
Susan Fletcher Crawford (1863–1918), Scottish etcher
Susan J. Crawford, American judge and senior Pentagon official, the convening authority for Guantanamo military commissions 2007–2010
Susan P. Crawford (born 1963), American professor of law at Harvard Law School

See also
Sue Crawford (born 1967), American politician from Nebraska